The Allegheny River is a  headwater stream of the Ohio River in western Pennsylvania and New York. The Allegheny River runs from its headwaters just below the middle of Pennsylvania's northern border northwesterly into New York then in a zigzag southwesterly across the border and through Western Pennsylvania to join the Monongahela River at the Forks of the Ohio at Point State Park in Downtown Pittsburgh, Pennsylvania. The Allegheny River is, by volume, the main headstream of both the Ohio and Mississippi Rivers. Historically, the Allegheny was considered to be the upper Ohio River by both Native Americans and European settlers.

The shallow river has been made navigable upstream from Pittsburgh to East Brady by a series of locks and dams constructed in the early 20th century. A 24-mile-long portion of the upper river in Warren and McKean counties of Pennsylvania and Cattaraugus County in New York is the Allegheny Reservoir, created by the erection of the Kinzua Dam in 1965 for flood control.

The name of the river comes from one of a number of Delaware/Unami phrases which are homophones of the English name, with varying translations.

Etymology

The name Allegheny probably comes from Lenape welhik hane or oolikhanna, which means 'best flowing river of the hills' or 'beautiful stream'. There is a Lenape legend of a tribe called "Allegewi" who used to live along the river. Hernando de Soto in 1540 and others such as Henry Schoolcraft in subsequent years report the "Allegewi" were the Cherokees.

The following account of the origin of the name Allegheny was given in 1780 by Moravian missionary David Zeisberger: "All this land and region, stretching as far as the creeks and waters that flow into the Alleghene the Delawares called Alligewinenk, which means 'a land into which they came from distant parts'. The river itself, however, is called Alligewi Sipo. The whites have made Alleghene out of this, the Six Nations calling the river the Ohio."

Indians, including the Lenni Lenape and Iroquois, considered the Allegheny and Ohio rivers as the same, as is suggested by a New York State road sign on Interstate 86 that refers to the Allegheny River also as Ohiːyo'''. The Geographic Names Information System lists O-hee-yo and O-hi-o as variant names. The river is called Ohi:'i:o` (river beautiful) in the Seneca language. In New York, areas around the river are often named with the alternate spelling Allegany in reference to the river; for example, the Village of Allegany and Allegany State Park. Port Allegany, located along the river in Pennsylvania near the border with New York, also follows this pattern.

Course

The stream flows south and passes under Pennsylvania Route 49 11 miles northeast of Coudersport where a historical marker that declares the start of the river is located. Cobb Hill is about a mile north. The stream flows southwest paralleling Route 49 to Coudersport.

It flows in a broad zigzag course generally southwest across Western Pennsylvania; first flowing southwest past Warren, Tidioute, Tionesta, Oil City, and Franklin, forming much of the northwestern boundary of Allegheny National Forest. South of Franklin it turns southeast across Clarion County in a meandering course, then turns again southwest across Armstrong County, flowing past Kittanning, Ford City, Clinton, and Freeport.Oil City, PA, 1:100,000 Scale Topographic Map, USGS, 1983

The river enters both Allegheny and Westmoreland counties, the Pittsburgh suburbs, and the City of Pittsburgh from the northeast. It passes the North Side, downtown Pittsburgh, and Point State Park. The Allegheny joins with the Monongahela River at the "Point" in downtown Pittsburgh to form the Ohio River.

Hydrography

Its tributaries reach to within  of Lake Erie in southwestern New York.

Water from the Allegheny River eventually flows into the Gulf of Mexico via the Ohio and Mississippi rivers.

The Allegheny Valley has been one of the most productive areas of fossil fuel extraction in United States history, with its extensive deposits of coal, petroleum, and natural gas.

Tributaries

Tunungwant "Tuna" Creek joins the river from the south in Carrollton, New York (flowing north from Bradford, Pennsylvania); the Great Valley Creek and Little Valley Creek join the river from the north at Salamanca, New York before becoming the Allegheny Reservoir.

Buffalo Creek enters at Freeport, Chartiers Run enters at Lower Burrell, Bull Creek enters at Tarentum, Pucketa Creek enters near New Kensington, Riddle Run enters at Springdale, and Girtys Run enters at Millvale. Many additional streams enter or join with the Allegheny River along its course.

Locks, dams and bridges

Several locks were built in the early 20th century to make the Allegheny River navigable for 72 miles upstream from Pittsburgh to East Brady.

The Allegheny River has eight locks and fixed-crest dams numbered two through nine: Allegheny River Lock and Dam No. 2, 3, 4, 5, 6, 7, 8, 9 which form corresponding reservoirs.

The river is also impounded by the Kinzua Dam in northwestern Pennsylvania, resulting in the Allegheny Reservoir also known as Kinzua Lake and Lake Perfidy among the Seneca. The Seneca Pumped Storage Generating Station is associated with Kinzua Dam.

Numerous bridges and tunnels span the river throughout its course. The Allegheny River Tunnel, utilized by Pittsburgh Light Rail, went into service in 2012.

History
In the latter half of the 17th century, control of the river valley passed back-and-forth between Algonquian-speaking Shawnee and the Iroquois. By the time of the arrival of the French in the early 18th century, the Shawnee were once again in control and formed an alliance with the French against the incursion of British settlement across the Allegheny Mountains. The conflict over the expansion of British settlement into the Allegheny Valley and the surrounding Ohio Country was a primary cause of the French and Indian War in the 1750s. During the war, the village of Kittanning – the principal Shawnee settlement on the river – was completely destroyed by British reprisal raids from Central Pennsylvania.

Nevertheless, the British, after gaining control of the area in the 1763 Treaty of Paris, kept the area closed to white settlement, in part to repair and maintain relations with the Native Americans. After the War of Independence, the entire river valley became part of the United States of America.

During the 19th century, the river became a principal means of navigation in the upper Ohio valley, especially for the transport of coal. Although the building of the railroads lessened the importance of the river somewhat, the lower river (navigable as far as East Brady, Pennsylvania through locks) has continued to serve as a route of commercial transportation until the present day. In 1859, the first U.S. petroleum was drilled north of the river at Titusville. One of the underlying premises of the Genesee Valley Canal was its connection to the river, opening a trade route from Rochester, New York to the west. The advent of the railroads obviated any interest Pennsylvania might have had in participating to improve navigation on the river. The canal was closed in 1877 and the right-of-way sold to the Genesee Valley Canal Railroad.

In 1965, the completion of the federally sponsored Kinzua Dam for flood-control in northwestern Pennsylvania east of Warren created the long Allegheny Reservoir, known as Lake Perfidy among the Seneca, part of which is included in the Allegheny National Recreation Area. The dam flooded parts of lands deeded "forever" to the Seneca Nation of Indians by the 1794 Treaty of Canandaigua, and lands given to Cornplanter and his descendants. The event was described in the Johnny Cash song "As Long as the Grass Shall Grow" from the 1964 album Bitter Tears: Ballads of the American Indian'', which focused on the history of and problems facing Native Americans in the United States.

The construction of the dam and the filling of the Allegheny Reservoir also necessitated the elimination of the small village of Corydon, which was located at the confluence of Willow Creek with the Allegheny River; and the small village of Kinzua, which was located at the confluence of Kinzua Creek with the Allegheny River. All residents of both villages were forced to move.

Many prominent individuals opposed the construction of the dam at that time because of the damage it would do to Seneca lands, including Pennsylvania Congressman John P. Saylor of Johnstown, and Howard Zahniser, executive director of The Wilderness Society and native of Tionesta—a small settlement located along the Allegheny River several miles downstream from Warren. During the campaign for the 1960 United States presidential election, John F. Kennedy assured the Seneca Nation that he would oppose the dam if elected. However, he failed to follow through on his pledge upon becoming president.

In 1992,  of the Allegheny River was designated Wild and Scenic. This designation comprises three segments of the river located in Warren, Forest, and Venango counties.

In 2008, Katie Spotz became the first person to swim the entire  of the Allegheny River; she was accompanied by safety kayaker, James Hendershott. The team began at the river's source in Warren, Pennsylvania on July 22 and finished at the "Point" in Downtown Pittsburgh on August 21.

Settlements

New York

Allegany
Carrollton
Jimerson Town
Olean
Portville
St. Bonaventure
Salamanca
Weston Mills

Pennsylvania

Applewold
Arnold
Aspinwall
Blawnox
Brackenridge
Cheswick
Coudersport
Creighton
East Brady
East Hickory
Eldred
Emlenton
Etna
Ford City
Foxburg
Franklin
Freeport
Harmarville
Kennerdell
Kittanning
Lower Burrell
Manorville
Millvale
Natrona
New Kensington
Oakmont
Oil City
Parker
Penn Hills
Pittsburgh
Plum
Port Allegany
Roulette
Schenley
Sharpsburg
Springdale
Starbrick
Tarentum
Templeton
Tidioute
Tionesta
Verona
Warren
West Hickory
West Kittanning
Woodland Heights
Youngsville

See also
Allegheny Islands State Park
Allegheny Riverfront Park
List of rivers of New York
List of rivers of Pennsylvania
Pittsburgh Flood of 1936
Pittsburgh Three Rivers Regatta

References

Further reading

External links

U.S. Geological Survey: PA stream gaging stations

Allegheny River
Rivers of New York (state)
Rivers of Pennsylvania
Tributaries of the Ohio River
Wild and Scenic Rivers of the United States
Geography of Pittsburgh
Rivers of Cattaraugus County, New York
Rivers of Allegheny County, Pennsylvania
Rivers of Westmoreland County, Pennsylvania
Rivers of Armstrong County, Pennsylvania
Rivers of Clarion County, Pennsylvania
Rivers of Venango County, Pennsylvania
Rivers of Butler County, Pennsylvania
Rivers of Forest County, Pennsylvania
Rivers of Warren County, Pennsylvania
Rivers of McKean County, Pennsylvania
Rivers of Potter County, Pennsylvania